Talulah Jane Riley-Milburn (born 26 September 1985) is an English actress and writer. She has appeared in films, including Pride & Prejudice (2005), St Trinian's (2007) and its sequel St Trinian's 2: The Legend of Fritton's Gold (2009), The Boat That Rocked (2009), and Inception (2010). Riley portrayed Angela on the HBO science-fiction Western television series Westworld (2016–2018) and Vivienne Westwood in the FX miniseries Pistol (2022).

Early life and education
Riley grew up in Hemel Hempstead in Hertfordshire, the only child of Una Riley, founder of a security systems company and a public relations company, and Doug Milburn, formerly head of the National Crime Squad. , her father works as a screenwriter  and has written episodes of Silent Witness, Prime Suspect and The Bill. Riley was educated at Cheltenham Ladies' College, independent Berkhamsted Collegiate School, and Haberdashers' Girls' School. While acting in London, she studied for a degree in Natural Sciences at the Open University.

Career

Television
Riley's television credits include episodes of Poirot (2003), Marple (2006), Doctor Who (2008's "Silence in the Library" and "Forest of the Dead"). She played Lila, a love-struck writer, in the short-lived E4 series Nearly Famous (2007).  She played Angela in the first two seasons of the television series Westworld.

Stage
Riley made her stage debut in The Philadelphia Story at the Old Vic in 2005. Her performance in a 2006 revival Tennessee Williams' Summer and Smoke was described by critic Rachel Read as being "delightful".

Film
Riley played Mary Bennet in the 2005 version of Pride and Prejudice, acted in the role of Marianne in 2009's The Boat That Rocked, and starred in the 2007 film St Trinian's and its 2009 sequel St Trinian's: The Legend of Fritton's Gold.

Riley appeared as a disguise used by Tom Hardy's character in Inception (2010). Also in 2010, Love and Distrust was released direct-to-video, featuring five unique short films; the first of these was The Summer House, in which Riley was co-lead, opposite Robert Pattinson. Available as a standalone download, The Summer House was the number one film on iTunes worldwide on its first day of release, holding that position for several days. She also appeared in White Frog.

Between 2009 and 2015, Riley developed an idea and story by her father into a screenplay, then ultimately directed (after being unable to hire another director to helm the project) and starred in the resulting feature film Scottish Mussel.

Writing 
Her debut novel, Acts of Love, was published by Hodder & Stoughton in August 2016.

In June 2022, Riley released her second novel, The Quickening, also published by Hodder & Soughton.

Other
She was featured on the March 2010 cover of Esquire.

In the year 2011, she was named a "Brit to Watch" by the British Academy of Film and Television Arts.

Personal life
In 2008, Riley began dating Elon Musk; they married in 2010 at Dornoch Cathedral in Scotland. In January 2012, Musk ended their relationship, and sought a divorce in March 2012.

In July 2013, Musk and Riley remarried. In a 60 Minutes interview in 2014, the couple stated that they had reconciled and were living together again, along with Musk's five remaining children from his first marriage to writer Justine Musk. On 31 December 2014, Musk filed for divorce a second time although he later withdrew the action. After living separately for six months, Riley filed for a second divorce in Los Angeles Superior Court on 21 March 2016. The divorce was finalised in October 2016.

Since July 2022, it has been reported that Riley is dating actor Thomas Brodie-Sangster after meeting while working together on Pistol.

During Elon Musk's acquisition of Twitter in October 2022, text exchanges between Musk and Riley were released where she pleaded with him to buy Twitter, asking "Please do something to fight woke-ism. I will do anything to help! xx"

Filmography

References

External links

1985 births
Living people
English expatriates in the United States
English film actresses
English stage actresses
English television actresses
People educated at Haberdashers' Girls' School
People from Hemel Hempstead
People educated at Cheltenham Ladies' College
Alumni of the Open University
21st-century English actresses
British expatriate actresses in the United States
Musk family